Clinton Historical Society may refer to:

 Clinton Historical Society (Connecticut), a historical society in Connecticut
 Clinton Historical Society (Clinton, New York)
 Clinton Historical Society (Maine), a historical society in Maine
 Clinton Historical Society (Massachusetts), a historical society in Massachusetts